Gaylord Anton Nelson (June 4, 1916July 3, 2005) was an American politician and environmentalist from Wisconsin who served as a United States senator and governor. He was a member of the Democratic Party and the founder of Earth Day, which launched a new wave of environmental activism.

Early life and education
Nelson was born in 1916 in Clear Lake, Wisconsin, the son of Mary (Bradt), a nurse, and Anton Nelson, a country doctor. He had Norwegian and Irish ancestry. He grew up and was educated in the local public schools. In 1939, he received a bachelor's in political science at what is now San Jose State University in San Jose, California. In 1942, he received an LL.B. degree from the University of Wisconsin Law School in Madison and was admitted to the bar. He practiced as a lawyer before serving in the United States Army, during which time he saw action in the Okinawa campaign during World War II.

Politics

In 1948, Nelson was elected to the Wisconsin State Senate. He remained there until 1958, when he was elected governor of Wisconsin. He served for four years as governor, in two two-year terms, before being elected to the United States Senate in 1962. He served three consecutive terms as a senator from 1963 to 1981. In 1963 he convinced President John F. Kennedy to take a national speaking tour to discuss conservation issues. Senator Nelson founded Earth Day, which began as a teach-in about environmental issues on April 22, 1970.

During his 1968 re-election campaign, Nelson was praised by Vince Lombardi, the General Manager and former coach of the Green Bay Packers, as the "nation's #1 conservationist" at a banquet in Oshkosh. Nelson's campaign turned Lombardi's banquet speech into a radio and television campaign commercial, infuriating Lombardi, the Wisconsin Republican Party, and Vince's wife, Marie, who was a staunch Republican.

Although known primarily for his environmental work, Nelson also was a leading consumer advocate, strong supporter of civil rights and civil liberties, and one of the early outspoken opponents of the Vietnam War. In 1969, Nelson was one of four senators to introduce a bill to establish the Wisconsin Islands Wilderness.

In 1970, Nelson called for Congressional hearings on the safety of combined oral contraceptive pills, which were famously called "The Nelson Pill Hearings." As a result of the hearings, side-effect disclosure in patient inserts was required for the pillthe first such disclosure for a pharmaceutical drug.
 
Nelson was also a noted advocate of small business. While chairman of the Senate Small Business Committee, he led successful efforts to authorize the first modern White House Conference on Small Business, create the system of Small Business Development Centers at U.S. universities, and improve the way that federal agencies regulate small businesses and other small entities, the Regulatory Flexibility Act.

In 1973, Nelson was one of the three senators who opposed the nomination of Gerald Ford to be Vice President. (The other two were Thomas Eagleton and William Hathaway.)

Environmentalism
After Nelson's 1980 defeat for re-election, he became counselor for The Wilderness Society in January 1981. He received the Presidential Medal of Freedom in September 1995 in recognition of his environmental work.

Nelson was inducted into the Wisconsin Conservation Hall of Fame in 1986. The Wisconsin Conservation Hall of fame is located at the Schmeeckle Reserve Visitor Center in Stevens Point, Wisconsin. The visitor center is maintained by the University of Wisconsin-Stevens Point.

Nelson viewed the stabilization of the nation's population as an important aspect of environmentalism. In his words:

The bigger the population gets, the more serious the problems become ... We have to address the population issue. The United Nations, with the U.S. supporting it, took the position in Cairo in 1994 that every country was responsible for stabilizing its own population. It can be done. But in this country, it's phony to say "I'm for the environment but not for limiting immigration."

He also rejected the suggestion that economic development should take precedence over environmental protection:

The economy is a wholly owned subsidiary of the environment, not the other way around.

In 2002, Nelson appeared on To Tell the Truth as a contestant, with his founding of Earth Day highlighted.

Death and legacy
Nelson died of cardiovascular failure at age 89 on July 3, 2005.

The Gaylord Nelson Institute for Environmental Studies (or Nelson Institute) at the University of Wisconsin–Madison is named after him in recognition of his love for nature. In addition, the Gaylord Nelson Wilderness in the Apostle Islands National Lakeshore –comprising more than 80% of the land area of the park – was named after him in honor of his efforts to have the park created. Governor Nelson State Park near Waunakee, Wisconsin, is also named after him. The elementary school in Clear Lake, Wisconsin is named Gaylord A. Nelson Educational Center.

References

Further reading
Christofferson, Bill. The Man from Clear Lake: Earth Day Founder Gaylord Nelson. Madison: University of Wisconsin Press, 2004. 
 Jones, Clayton R. "Gaylord Nelson, Father of Earth Day: Bridging the Gap from Conservation to Environmentalism" (Senior thesis). University of Wisconsin-Eau Claire, 2009.
Nelson, Gaylord, Susan Campbell and Paul R Wozniak. Beyond Earth Day: Fulfilling the Promise. Madison: University of Wisconsin Press, 2002.

External links
Gaylord Nelson and Earth Day: The Making of the Modern Environmental Movement – a narrative account of the origins of Earth Day, Gaylord Nelson's political career
 Gaylord Nelson papers, 1954–2006 held by the Wisconsin Historical Society.

 Retrieved on 2008-02-06
Gaylord Nelson (Gamma Nu) – Former U.S. Senator – Gaylord Nelson Biography.

|-

|-

|-

|-

|-

1916 births
2005 deaths
20th-century American politicians
American environmentalists
Democratic Party governors of Wisconsin
Democratic Party United States senators from Wisconsin
Military personnel from Wisconsin
United States Army personnel of World War II
People from Polk County, Wisconsin
Presidential Medal of Freedom recipients
San Jose State University alumni
Sierra Club awardees
United States Army officers
University of Wisconsin Law School alumni
Democratic Party Wisconsin state senators
Burials in Wisconsin